The Nevsky Express (No. 167B/168B) is a Russian Railways express train, formerly the fastest on the prominent route between the Leningradsky Rail Terminal in Moscow and the Moskovsky Rail Terminal in Saint Petersburg (the Saint Petersburg–Moscow Railway). The train has a maximum speed of 200 km/h (125 mph) and does not make any intermediate station stops. It consists of a Škoda Chs200 locomotive, 13 passenger cars and a restaurant car. It features 6-person compartments in some cars and airline style seating in other cars.

The Nevsky Express was initially retired with the introduction of the faster Sapsan high speed trains but was later reinstated in the schedule in 2010. The train covers the distance between Moscow and Saint Petersburg in 4 hours 10 minutes.  By comparison, the Sapsan trains take between 3 hours 30 minutes(minimum time) and 4 hours(maximum time) to make the same trip.

See also 
 2007 Nevsky Express bombing (Malaya Vishera)
 2009 Nevsky Express bombing
 List of named passenger trains of Russia

Named passenger trains of Russia
Railway services introduced in 2001